Silver Springs State Park, formerly known as Silver River State Park, is a Florida state park located on the Silver River in Marion County. The park contains Silver Springs, Florida's first tourist attraction.

The Silver Springs attraction dates to the 1870s. In 1985, the state purchased the land surrounding Silver Springs to spare it from development, creating the Silver River State Park. In 1993, the state acquired Silver Springs, as well, though it continued to be operated privately. In 2013, the state took over control of Silver Springs, merging it with the adjacent parkland to create Silver Springs State Park.

History

Silver Springs

State park

In 1985, the State of Florida purchased about 5,000 acres of undeveloped land around Silver Springs to keep it from being developed. The land was turned over to the Department of Recreation and Parks in 1987, creating the Silver River State Park. The same year, Marion County Schools constructed the Silver River Museum and Environmental Education Center on the property. Little else was at the park until 1999, when the state began construction on a ranger station, campground, and kayak launch.

In 1993, the state purchased Silver Springs with the ultimate intention of taking it over. The previous owners continued to operate the attraction under lease. It went through several operators before Palace Entertainment took over management of Silver Springs Nature Theme Park in 2002. In January 2013, after years of declining profits and increasing environmental problems, the state took over control of the park, releasing Palace Entertainment from their obligations. The same year, they merged Silver Springs into Silver River State Park, creating Silver Springs State Park.

Ecology
Among the wildlife of the park are nine-banded armadillos, white-tailed deer, wild boars, wild turkeys, foxes, American alligators, Sherman fox squirrels, and gopher tortoises, as well as coyotes, bobcats, and Florida black bears.

Also, a colony of non-native rhesus macaques were  introduced to the park in early 1938 by a tour boat operator, known locally as "Colonel Tooey", to enhance his "Jungle Cruise" ride. A local legend that they are the descendants of monkeys used to enhance the scenery for the Tarzan movies that were shot in the area in the 1930s is not true, since no Tarzan movie filmed in the area featured rhesus macaques. The monkeys are allowed to live in Florida, due to their contributions to science.

The diversity of this waterway is among the highest in Florida. Since becoming part of the Florida state park system, the increased interest and reduced barriers to entry have brought many new visitors to the park. The damage to the river grasses and wildlife is a real concern.

Movies filmed at Silver Springs
 Blindfold (1966)
 Creature from the Black Lagoon (1954)
 Legend (1985)
 Moonraker (1979)
 Never Say Never Again (1983)
 Rebel Without A Cause (1955)
 Revenge of the Creature (1955)
 Sea Hunt, television series (1958-1961)
 Smokey and the Bandit Part 3 (1983)
 Tarzan and His Mate (1934)
 Tarzan the Ape Man (1932)
 The Yearling (1946)
 Thunderball (1965)
 Underwater! (1955)

Silver River

Silver Springs, located in the park, drains into the Silver River, a  stream that flows east from the springs to the Ocklawaha River.

Recreational activities and amenities

Glass-bottom boats are located within the park and are based at the site of the former Silver Springs Nature Theme Park.

Other activities include bicycling, canoeing, kayaking, camping, and wildlife viewing. Amenities include a museum and an environmental center that are open on weekends and major holidays. The park has  of trails, access to the Silver River, 10 luxury cabins, and a 59-site, full-facility campground.

The Silver River Museum and Environmental Education Center, with educational facilities, is run by the Marion County Public School System in cooperation with the Florida Park Service. The center has a village of restored or "newly built" 19th-century farm buildings (houses, meeting house, sheds, blacksmith, etc.) and a museum on the natural and social history of the area. Used during the week by the school district for classes, on the weekends, it is open to the public. One week, early in November, the center also puts on the Ocali County Days as a fund raiser. This is a 19th-century, living history event with displays, talks, and performances incorporating living historians. For that Tuesday through Friday, it is open to public, private, and home schooled children and their teachers, who have made reservations with the center. The event is open to the general public on Saturday and Sunday and has become a popular annual attraction in the area.

Hours
The park is open from 8:00 am till sundown year round. The gate remains open until 10:00 pm on Fridays for campers.

References

External links

Silver Springs State Park at Florida State Parks
Silver River State Park at Absolutely Florida
Silver River State Park at Wildernet

Florida Native American Heritage Trail
History of Silver Springs, Florida
Outstanding Florida Waters
Parks in Marion County, Florida
State parks of Florida
Tourist attractions in Marion County, Florida
2013 establishments in Florida